Krzysztof Pecyna (born 14 September 1978) is a former speedway rider from Poland.

Speedway career
He rode in the top tier of British Speedway riding for the Wolverhampton Wolves during the 2005 Elite League speedway season and 2006 Elite League speedway season. He began his career riding for Polonia Piła in 1996.

References 

1978 births
Living people
Polish speedway riders
Wolverhampton Wolves riders